Nick the Sting is a 1976 Italian film directed by Fernando Di Leo. It stars actor Gabriele Ferzetti.

Cast
Luc Merenda as Nick Hezard
Lee J. Cobb as Robert Clark
Gabriele Ferzetti as Maurice
Luciana Paluzzi as Anna
Dagmar Lassander as Chantal
Isabella Biagini as Edy
Mario Pisu as Phil
Riccardo Salvino as Mark
William Berger as Roizman
Valentina Cortese as Nick's mother

Production
Nick the Sting was described by Italian film historian and critic Roberto Curti as a "work for hire" for director Fernando Di Leo. The film went into production after finishing Kidnap Syndicate with a screenplay already written by Alberto Silvestri based around the film The Sting. Di Leo commented that film had "quite a good script [...] but it had a couple huge problems: it would cost too much to film as it was written, and badly needed a charismatic lead."

Nick the Sting was shot at Elios Studio in Rome and on location in Geneve. Leo recalled that the film did not have a good production, finding Merenda not up to the task as a lead and the script did not come up as well as it had on paper.

Release
Nick the Sting was distributed theatrically in Italy by Interfilm on 29 April 1976. The film grossed a total of 427,272,200 Italian lire domestically. It was released on DVD in Italy by Raro Video.

See also 
 List of Italian films of 1976

References

Footnotes

Sources

External links

1976 films
1970s Italian-language films
Poliziotteschi films
Films directed by Fernando Di Leo
Films about con artists
Films scored by Luis Bacalov
1970s Italian films